Bahunidanda is a town (previously: a Village Development Committee)  in Halesi Tuwachung municipal area in Khotang District of Province No. 1 of eastern Nepal. At the time of the 1991 Nepal census it had a population of 2,365 persons living in 401 individual households.

The VDC was Incorporated with Halesi Tuwachung in 2017 when the government of Nepal decided to restructure to the old local level body.

References

External links
UN map of the municipalities of Khotang District

Populated places in Khotang District